John Mathieson Dodds OBE (13 September 1905 – 15 October 1983) was a Scottish electrical engineer.  He was educated at the University of Aberdeen and at the Technische Hochschule, Aachen, where he won a Dr Ing. in 1933.

Dodds worked in the Research Department of Metropolitan-Vickers Electrical Co. in Trafford Park, Manchester, developing high-power thermionic valves, used in the transmitter part of equipment for radar stations for defence (Chain Home system), thereby making a significant contribution to Britain's survival in World War II. He was appointed an Officer of the Order of the British Empire (OBE) in the 1944 Birthday Honours.

References

Further reading
Brown, Jim, Radar - how it all began,  .
Dodds, JM and Ludlow, JH (1946), Journal of the IEE, 93, Part IIIA, pp 1123–1129.
Swords, Sean S (1986),  Technical History of the Beginnings of Radar, pp 209, 270.
Watson-Watt, Robert (1957), Three Steps to Victory. Photograph of JMD.

Officers of the Order of the British Empire
Scottish electrical engineers
Alumni of the University of Aberdeen
RWTH Aachen University alumni
1905 births
1983 deaths
Metropolitan-Vickers people
Radar pioneers
People from Aberdeen